Joëlle Numainville (born November 20, 1987) is a Canadian former road bicycle racer.

Career
She competed at the 2012 Summer Olympics in the women's road race, finishing 12th. Numainville left  for Belgium-based  in August 2014, replacing Briton Emma Pooley who retired from cycling. The  announced that Numainville would join them for the 2015 season. Numainville retired in 2018 due to phlebitis, and moved into the financial sector.

Major results
Source:

2008
 2nd Road race, National Under-23 Road Championships
2009
 1st  Road race, Pan American Road Championships
 National Under-23 Road Championships
1st  Road race
3rd Time trial
 Tucson Bicycle Classic
1st Stages 2 & 3
 5th Overall Trophée d'Or Féminin
1st Stage 5
2010
 1st  Road race, National Road Championships
 1st Grand Prix Cycliste de Gatineau
 2nd  Road race, Pan American Road Championships
 6th Road race, Commonwealth Games
 6th Liberty Classic
2011
 1st Clarendon Cup
 2nd Grand Prix Cycliste de Gatineau
 4th Road race, Pan American Road Championships
 4th Liberty Classic
 5th Road race, National Road Championships
 6th Road race, Pan American Games
 6th Overall Holland Ladies Tour
 6th Tour of Flanders for Women
 8th GP de Plouay – Bretagne
2012
 1st Stage 4 Tour Cycliste Féminin International de l'Ardèche
 National Road Championships
3rd Road race
5th Time trial
 3rd Overall San Dimas Stage Race
 3rd Tour of Flanders for Women
 4th Grand Prix Cycliste de Gatineau
 5th Liberty Classic
2013
 National Road Championships
1st  Road race
1st  Time trial
 2nd Grand Prix cycliste de Gatineau
 2nd Chrono Gatineau
 2nd Philadelphia Cycling Classic
 5th Overall Tour Cycliste Féminin International de l'Ardèche
1st Stage 4
 6th Road race, Jeux de la Francophonie
2014
 2nd Winston-Salem Cycling Classic
 6th Overall Trophée d'Or Féminin
2015
 1st  Road race, National Road Championships
 2nd Grand Prix cycliste de Gatineau
 5th Winston-Salem Cycling Classic
 6th Overall Thüringen Rundfahrt der Frauen
2016
 1st White Spot / Delta Road Race
 National Road Championships
2nd Road race
3rd Time trial
 2nd Grand Prix Cycliste de Gatineau
 2nd Crescent Vårgårda UCI Women's WorldTour TTT
 UCI Road World Championships
3rd  Team time trial
9th Road race
 3rd GP de Plouay – Bretagne
 4th La Course by Le Tour de France
 5th Chrono Gatineau
 6th RideLondon Grand Prix
 7th Gran Premio Bruno Beghelli Internazionale Donne Elite
2017
 4th Grand Prix Cycliste de Gatineau
 7th White Spot / Delta Road Race

References

External links

  
 

1987 births
Living people
Canadian female cyclists
Cyclists at the 2010 Commonwealth Games
Cyclists at the 2012 Summer Olympics
Olympic cyclists of Canada
Cyclists from Montreal
Commonwealth Games competitors for Canada
Cyclists at the 2011 Pan American Games
Pan American Games competitors for Canada